State Route 166 (SR 166) is a short route in Coffee County in the southeastern part of the state.  The western terminus of the route is at its junction with SR 141 at Danleys Crossroads, an unincorporated community in the western part of the county.  The eastern terminus of the route is at its junction with U.S. Route 84 (US 84) at Elba.

Route description
State Route 166 is a five-mile (8 km) long route.  The route traverses along a two-lane road in western Coffee County, passing through no towns or unincorporated communities until it reaches Elba.

History
When State Route 166 was created in 1972, its western terminus was approximately two miles south of the current terminus. At this intersection, eastbound traffic on US 84 was routed onto northbound SR 141, and through traffic on the roadway that had been carrying US 84 traffic continued on SR 166 until it junctioned with US 84 again west of Elba. In 1989, SR 166 and US 84 exchanged routings between SR 141 and Elba as part of improvements, including widening to four lanes, of US 84 across south Alabama.

Major intersections

References

166
Transportation in Coffee County, Alabama